The 78th district of the Texas House of Representatives consists of a portion of El Paso County. The current Representative is Joe Moody, who has represented the district since 2013.

References 

78